"What's the Difference" is a song by Dr. Dre.

What's the Difference may also refer to:

 What's the Difference?, a book by John Piper, later republished as part of Recovering Biblical Manhood and Womanhood
 What's the Difference'', a 1986 TV movie about IVF starring Debra Lawrance
 "Eyelash Curlers & Butcher Knives (What's the Difference?)", a song by Jeffree Star